The  is a learned society in Japan. The Society's objective is "To promote research and education in the area of statistics, and to contribute to the progress of statistical sciences". JSS was founded in 1931. Its membership consists of researchers, teachers, and professional statisticians in many different fields.

JSS publications include Journal of the Japan Statistical Society (English series, biannual), Journal of the Japan Statistical Society (Japanese series, biannual), a quarterly newsletter, and JSS Research Series in Statistics.

JSS is an affiliate of the International Statistical Institute.

See also
 Statistics Bureau (Japan)

Notes

External links
 The Japan Statistical Society  (JSS website)
 Journal of the Japan Statistical Society  (J-STAGE)

Learned societies of Japan
Statistical organizations